Puma Wachana (Quechua puma cougar, puma, wacha birth, to give birth, -na a suffix, "where the cougar is born", Hispanicized spelling Puma Huachana) is a mountain in Peru, about  high.

References 

Mountains of Puno Region
Mountains of Peru